Chiriaco or Chiri Yaku (Quechua: chiri cold, yaku water, "cold water", also spelled Chiriaco) is a mountain in Peru which reaches a height of approximately . It is located in the Apurímac Region, Andahuaylas Province, on the border of the districts of Chicmo District and Talavera.

Southwest of Chiri Yaku there is another mountain of that name (also spelled Chiriyacu or Chiviyacu). It lies on the border of the districts of Chicmo and Huancaray.

References

Mountains of Peru
Mountains of Apurímac Region